is a Japanese screenwriter and producer.

Career
Sakurai was born in Tochigi, Japan. He returned there when he was 13, and graduated from University of Tokyo majoring in economics. His theses on Japanese animation and subculture won several awards. While still a college student, he wrote eight episodes of the anime television series Ghost in the Shell: Stand Alone Complex. After graduation, he was employed at Production I.G. and wrote for the second series, Ghost in the Shell: S.A.C. 2nd GIG, and for the TV movie Ghost in the Shell: Stand Alone Complex - Solid State Society.

Filmography

Anime
 Ghost in the Shell: Stand Alone Complex (Screenwriter; eps3,8,11,12,15,17,24,25)
 Ghost in the Shell: S.A.C. 2nd GIG (Screenwriter; eps1,10,14,24)
 Moribito: Guardian of the Spirit (Screenwriter; eps3,8,12,16,20,24)
 Blood+ (Screenwriter; eps 3, 11, 20)
 xxxHolic (Screenwriter; eps2,5,9,13,19,SP)
 xxxHolic:Kei (Screenwriter; ep7)
 Otogi Zoshi (Chief Screenwriter; eps1,6,13,18,24,26)
 Real Drive (Screenwriter; eps8,10,17,24)
 Appleseed XIII (Screenwriter; eps2,4,10,13)
 Recovery of an MMO Junkie (executive producer)
 Ojarumaru (Screenwriter; from 10th season)

Feature films
 Ghost in the Shell: Stand Alone Complex - Solid State Society (Screenwriter)
 xxxHolic: A Midsummer Night's Dream  (Screenwriter)
 Evangelion: 1.0 You Are (Not) Alone   (Screenplay Cooperation)
 Evangelion: 2.0 You Can (Not) Advance   (Screenplay Cooperation)
 Musashi: The Dream of the Last Samurai   (Storyboard)
 Redline (Screenwriter)
 Giovanni's Island (Screenwriter, Producer)
 CYBORG009 CALL OF JUSTICE (Producer)
 colorful ninja iromaki (Producer)
 Napping Princess (Producer)

Bibliography
 Kutikula (manga)
 Tachikomatic Days  (manga)
 God Voice (manga)
 Philosophia Robotica (critique)

References

External links
 
 Yoshiki Sakurai anime at Media Arts Database 

1977 births
Anime screenwriters
Living people
People from Tokyo
Production I.G
Japanese screenwriters